Lydia Peelle is an American fiction writer. In 2009 the National Book Foundation named her a "5 under 35" Honoree.

Life
Peelle was born in Boston, Massachusetts. Before her writing career, Peelle worked as a speechwriter for the Governor of Tennessee. She received a creative writing MFA from the University of Virginia. Her short fiction has appeared in Granta, Orion, Prairie Schooner, and elsewhere. Peelle lives in Nashville, Tennessee.

Awards
 2006 O. Henry Award for "Mule Killers"
 2009 National Book Foundation 5 under 35 honoree for fiction
 2010 Whiting Award for Fiction

Works
 The Midnight Cool.  Harper Perennial. 2017. .
 
"Phantom Pain," Originally published in Granta 102: The New Nature Writing, Summer 2008
"Reasons for and Advantages of Breathing," Originally published in One Story, Issue 87, January 2007

References

External links
Profile at The Whiting Foundation
Interview with Gillian Welch for BOMB

Living people
University of Virginia alumni
American women short story writers
American speechwriters
American women non-fiction writers
Year of birth missing (living people)
Writers from Boston
21st-century American short story writers
21st-century American non-fiction writers
21st-century American women writers